Koin is a village in the province of Nayala in Burkina Faso. 
Koin has a population of 3.330.

References

Nayala Province
Populated places in the Boucle du Mouhoun Region